The 1921 Akron Pros season was their second in the league. The team failed to improve on their previous output of 8–0–3, losing three games. They finished third in the league.

Schedule

Standings

References

Akron Pros seasons
Akron Pros
Akron Pros